Andries Jacobus Malan (born 29 July 1991) is a South African cricketer. He was included in the North West squad for the 2016 Africa T20 Cup. In August 2017, he was named in Jo'burg Giants' squad for the first season of the T20 Global League. However, in October 2017, Cricket South Africa initially postponed the tournament until November 2018, with it being cancelled soon after.

He won the North-West Dragons Player of the Year award for the 2016–17 season. In September 2018, he was named as the captain of Western Province's squad for the 2018 Africa T20 Cup. In September 2019, he was named as the captain of Western Province's squad for the 2019–20 CSA Provincial T20 Cup. In April 2021, he was named in South Western Districts' squad, ahead of the 2021–22 cricket season in South Africa.

References

External links
 

1991 births
Living people
South African cricketers
North West cricketers
Northerns cricketers
Northern Knights cricketers
Western Province cricketers
People from Mbombela